The Lebhar IMP Pairs national bridge championship is held at the spring American Contract Bridge League (ACBL) North American Bridge Championship (NABC).

The Lebhar IMP Pairs is a four-session IMP pairs event with two qualifying and two final sessions. The event typically starts on the second Thursday of the NABC. The event is open.

History
The Lebhar IMP Pairs is a four-session event --- two qualifying sessions followed by two final sessions. The winners have their names inscribed on the Lebhar Trophy. Scoring is by International Match Points (IMPs).

The trophy was donated by Bertram Lebhar Jr. in 1948 in memory of his wife, Evelyn. The trophy was previously given to winners of the Mixed Teams but re-designated for the IMP Pairs by the ACBL Board of Directors.  Lebhar (1907–1972), under the name of Bert Lee, earned a national reputation as a sportscaster and later as a bridge player and administrator. In private life, he owned radio and television stations in Florida. Lebhar was one of the founders of the Greater New York Bridge Association and was elected its first president in 1948. Lebhar was also a player: he won the Spingold in 1940 and the Master Mixed Teams in 1946. His team was his wife Evelyn along with Samuel Katz and Alicia Kemper.

Winners

Sources

List of previous winners, Page 12

2009 winners, Page 1

External links
ACBL official website

North American Bridge Championships